James Golder (28 March 1955 – 12 March 2000) was an English professional association footballer who played as a midfielder. He played in the Football League for Stockport County.

Golder was an apprentice with Stockport County. He played just one league game for Stockport, away to Bury in April 1972, while still aged just under 17 years old. On leaving Stockport, he played for Stalybridge Celtic, Hyde United and Witton Albion from where he joined Mossley in September 1984. He played over 100 times for Mossley. He was later assistant manager of Radcliffe Borough.

Golder died at age 44. In August 2001 a benefit match was held at Woodley Sports including a combined Radcliffe Borough/Hyde United side.

References

1955 births
2000 deaths
Footballers from Manchester
English footballers
Association football midfielders
Stockport County F.C. players
Stalybridge Celtic F.C. players
Hyde United F.C. players
Witton Albion F.C. players
Mossley A.F.C. players
English Football League players